Pirazmeyan (also Romanized as Pīrāzmeyān and Pīrāzmīān; also known as Birāzmand and Parāzmeyān) is a village in Naqdi Rural District, Meshgin-e Sharqi District, Meshgin Shahr County, Ardabil Province, Iran. At the 2006 census, its population was 393, in 93 families.

References 

Tageo

Towns and villages in Meshgin Shahr County